Gusztáv Kettesi (17 May 1929 – 4 July 2003) was a Hungarian swimmer. He competed in two events at the 1952 Summer Olympics.

References

1929 births
2003 deaths
Hungarian male swimmers
Olympic swimmers of Hungary
Swimmers at the 1952 Summer Olympics
Sportspeople from Debrecen
20th-century Hungarian people
21st-century Hungarian people